Der Herr der Liebe (The Master of Love) is a 1919 silent film directed in Germany by Fritz Lang. It was his second film.  Carl de Vogt and Gilda Langer starred, as they had in Lang's debut feature, Halbblut. Lang himself is said to have acted in a supporting role.

The film is now considered to be lost.

Plot 
Residing in a castle in the Carpathian Mountains, Hungarian nobleman Vasile Disecu becomes infatuated with Suzette, the daughter of his neighbor. He mistakes Stefana, a maid who is secretly in love with him, for Suzette and makes love to her. When Yvette, his wife or mistress, finds out, she avenges herself with a liaison with Lazar, a Jewish peddler. Vasile imprisons Lazar. He kills Yvette and then himself.

Cast 
Carl de Vogt as Vasile Disecu
Gilda Langer as Yvette
Erika Unruh as Stefana
Max Narlinski as Lazar
Sadjah Gezza as Suzette

See also 
List of films made in Weimar Germany
List of lost films

References

External links

Der Herr der Liebe at SilentEra

1919 films
German silent feature films
German black-and-white films
Films directed by Fritz Lang
Films of the Weimar Republic
Lost German films
1919 romantic drama films
1910s thriller films
Films produced by Erich Pommer
Silent thriller films
1910s German films